Callum James Hudson-Odoi (born 7 November 2000) is an English professional footballer who plays as a winger for German Bundesliga club Bayer Leverkusen, on loan from  club Chelsea.

During his time with Chelsea's academy, Hudson-Odoi was part of the squads which won the U18 Premier League in 2017 as well as back-to-back FA Youth Cup titles. His form at youth level was rewarded in January 2018 when he was handed his senior debut and he has since made over 110 appearances for the club.

Hudson-Odoi also enjoyed considerable success at youth level for England, being part of the squad which ended as runners-up in the UEFA European Under-17 Championship and which won the FIFA U-17 World Cup in the same year. In March 2019, he became the youngest player to debut in a competitive match for England, doing so in UEFA Euro 2020 qualifiers against the Czech Republic.

Early life
Hudson-Odoi was born in Wandsworth, London to Ghanaian parents  and raised in Wandsworth, London. He is the younger brother of non-League striker Bradley Hudson-Odoi and the second son of former Hearts of Oak Ghanaian midfielder Bismark Odoi. He has a younger brother. Hudson-Odoi was educated at independent Whitgift School in Croydon.

Club career

Chelsea

Early career

Hudson-Odoi joined Chelsea in 2007 and made his under-18 debut in August 2016. He went on to net eight times in twenty-five appearances in his debut campaign, assisting the under-18's to their eight FA Youth Cup triumph. Following this, Hudson-Odoi was promoted to the under-23 team at the age of sixteen and went on to score four times in three games during their EFL Trophy campaign, including a double in their 2–2 draw with League One team Plymouth Argyle.

On 20 December 2017, Hudson-Odoi first appeared in Chelsea's matchday squad in their EFL Cup tie against AFC Bournemouth, remaining as an unused substitute in the 2–1 victory. On 28 January 2018, Hudson-Odoi made his first-team debut in the FA Cup match against Newcastle United. He came off the bench in the 81st minute, replacing Pedro in a 3–0 home victory. His Premier League debut came as a substitute on 31 January in a 3–0 home loss to Bournemouth.

2018–19 season
Following an impressive 2018–19 pre-season under the newly appointed Maurizio Sarri, the Italian announced that Hudson-Odoi would stay with the Chelsea first-team squad for the forthcoming campaign. Following this, Hudson-Odoi was handed the number 20 jersey. On 5 August 2018, Hudson-Odoi made his first start for the club during their FA Community Shield defeat to Manchester City, featuring for 59 minutes in the 2–0 loss. In his first Europa League start against PAOK, he scored his first goal for the senior team, which went on to win 4–0 at Stamford Bridge on 29 November.

On 5 January 2019, in Chelsea's FA Cup third-round opener against Nottingham Forest, he assisted both of Álvaro Morata's goals in a 2–0 win. During the January transfer window Hudson-Odoi was reportedly the subject of multiple transfer bids from Bayern Munich, with Chelsea's assistant manager Gianfranco Zola and Bayern's director of sport Hasan Salihamidžić both confirming the interest. Chelsea boss Maurizio Sarri criticised Bayern Munich's public conduct. On 26 January 2019, it was announced that Hudson-Odoi had put in an official transfer request. However, he was selected for Chelsea's next match the following day, a home tie in the FA Cup against Sheffield Wednesday. Hudson-Odoi played 90 minutes, scoring in a 3–0 win. Two days later, Sarri confirmed that Hudson-Odoi would be staying at the club.

In March 2019, Chelsea complained about alleged racism aimed at Hudson-Odoi during a match against Dynamo Kyiv. He was later offered counselling for the incident. On 3 April, he made his first league start for Chelsea and assisted Olivier Giroud for the opening goal in a 3–0 win over Brighton & Hove Albion. In doing so, he became the youngest player to assist a goal on his first start for the club in the Premier League era, aged 18 years and 146 days. On 22 April 2019, Hudson-Odoi was removed in the first half of a match against Burnley with an injury to his Achilles tendon, ruling him out for the rest of the season.

2019–20 season

Hudson-Odoi was again pursued by Bayern Munich in the summer of 2019, with Chelsea rejecting a £22.5 million bid, compared to the £35 million offer in January.

In July 2019, after Frank Lampard was appointed as Chelsea head coach, Lampard said of Hudson-Odoi: "He can show, right here at Chelsea, the team he came through the academy at, that he is going to be a world-class player – because I truly believe that." Following much speculation about Hudson-Odoi's future, he signed a new five-year contract with Chelsea on 20 September 2019. In October 2019 he said he had made the right choice in staying with the club, and in November 2019 he said he was convinced to stay following a conversation with Lampard.

On 11 January 2020, he scored his first Premier League goal in Chelsea's 3–0 home win against Burnley.

2020–21 season
Hudson-Odoi scored his first goal of the new season, coming off the bench to net Chelsea's second in an eventual 3–3 draw at West Bromwich Albion on 26 September. Chelsea came back from 3–0 down to tie the match. A month later on 28 October, Hudson-Odoi scored his first-ever goal in the UEFA Champions League, opening the scoring in a 4–0 away win at Krasnodar.

Following the departure of Frank Lampard, and the subsequent appointment of Thomas Tuchel, Hudson-Odoi began playing more regularly. He started the first three matches under Tuchel, who immediately began to deploy him as a wing-back. Hudson-Odoi said "It was something new for me. It was my first time trying it [in training] and I felt alright playing in it, it wasn't a problem for me. It was good trying to play that position." Hudson-Odoi was named Man of the Match in Chelsea's 2–0 win against Burnley on 31 January 2021, also providing the assist for César Azpilicueta’s goal.

On 20 February 2021, Hudson-Odoi was brought on as a half-time substitute replacing Tammy Abraham with Chelsea trailing 1–0 to Southampton. However, Tuchel opted to substitute Hudson-Odoi back off just 31 minutes after halftime, replacing him with Hakim Ziyech. Following the match, Tuchel said, "I was not happy with his attitude, energy and counter-pressing. I took him off and we demand 100%, I feel he is not in the right shape to help us. It was a hard decision but tomorrow it is forgotten." Tuchel reportedly apologized to Hudson-Odoi following the match, saying "Maybe it is even unfair, but it was my feeling." Hudson-Odoi went on to start the next match, a 1–0 win against Atlético Madrid in the Champions League.

On 29 May, Hudson-Odoi was part of the Chelsea squad that defeated Manchester City 1–0 in the UEFA Champions League Final.

2021–22 season 
On 23 October 2021, Hudson-Odoi scored his first goal of the season in Chelsea's 7–0 win against Norwich City.

2022–23 season: Loan to Bayer Leverkusen
On 30 August 2022, Hudson-Odoi joined Bundesliga team Bayer Leverkusen on a season-long loan deal. He scored his first goal for Bayer Leverkusen in a 2-2 away draw at Atlético Madrid in the UEFA Champions League on 26 October.

International career
Eligible for both England and Ghana, Hudson-Odoi has represented England at every age group from under-16 to under-19 level. In April 2017, he was included in the squad for the 2017 UEFA European Under-17 Championship. He scored in the semifinal against Turkey and again in the final, although England eventually lost to Spain on a penalty shoot-out. His performances led to him being included in the team of the tournament. Hudson-Odoi was also an influential figure during England's 2017 FIFA U-17 World Cup campaign, netting once in seven appearances and featuring for the entire 90 minutes during their 5–2 final victory over Spain.

In March 2018, Hudson-Odoi scored for England under-18 in a match against Belarus. In September 2018 he scored for the England under-19 team against Belgium.

He was called up by the England under-21 team for the first time in March 2019. A few days later, following injury to some of the senior squad players, he was called up to Gareth Southgate's senior squad for UEFA Euro 2020 qualifiers against Czech Republic and Montenegro. Upon receiving his maiden call-up, Hudson-Odoi said he was "shocked" and described it as "a dream come true". He made his debut on 22 March as a 70th-minute substitute in a 5–0 win over the Czech Republic at Wembley Stadium. Upon doing so, he became the youngest-ever player to make his debut in a competitive match for England, aged 18 years and 135 days, breaking the record set by Duncan Edwards in 1955 by 40 days.

Three days later, he made his first competitive start for England and impressed in a 5–1 win over Montenegro, registering an assist for his Chelsea teammate Ross Barkley's two goals. Upon making his full debut, he became the second youngest ever player to start a competitive match for England, after Wayne Rooney in April 2003, and following the match manager Gareth Southgate praised him for his application.

On 11 October 2019, Hudson-Odoi made his England U-21 debut during a 2–2 draw against the Slovenia U-21s in Maribor.

In August 2021, Hudson-Odoi turned down the opportunity to play for the England under-21 team against Romania and Kosovo. His Chelsea manager questioned his decision.

Career statistics

Club

International

Honours

Chelsea U18
U18 Premier League: 2016–17
FA Youth Cup: 2016–17, 2017–18     

Chelsea
UEFA Champions League: 2020–21
UEFA Europa League: 2018–19
UEFA Super Cup: 2021
FIFA Club World Cup: 2021
FA Cup runner-up: 2019–20, 2020–21
EFL Cup runner-up: 2018–19, 2021–22

England U17
FIFA U-17 World Cup: 2017
UEFA European Under-17 Championship runner-up: 2017

Individual
UEFA European Under-17 Championship Team of the Tournament: 2017
Chelsea Young Player of the Year: 2018–19

References

External links

Profile at the Chelsea F.C. website
Profile at the Football Association website

2000 births
Living people
Footballers from Wandsworth
English footballers
Association football wingers
Chelsea F.C. players
Bayer 04 Leverkusen players
Premier League players
Bundesliga players
FA Cup Final players
UEFA Champions League winning players
England youth international footballers
England under-21 international footballers
England international footballers
English expatriate footballers
Expatriate footballers in Germany
English expatriate sportspeople in Germany
Black British sportsmen
English people of Ghanaian descent
People educated at Whitgift School